La Damigella di Bard is a 1936 Italian drama film directed by Mario Mattoli.

Cast
Emma Gramatica as  Maria Clotilde di Bard
Luigi Cimara as  Il marchese Luciano di Pombia
Carlo Tamberlani as  Ferdinandi di Bard
Cesare Bettarini as  Franco Toscani
Amelia Chellini as  Signora Ponzetti
Luigi Pavese as Avv. Palmieri
Achille Majeroni as  Il padre di Maria (as Achile Majeroni)
Olga Pescatori as  Denise
Mirella Pardi as Renata
Armando Migliari as  Amilcare Pacotti
Vasco Creti as Papa Ponzetti
Romolo Costa as  Il conte Amedeo
Rina Valli as  Orsolina
Mario Brizzolari as L'ufficiale giudiziario
Eugenio Duse as  Filippo Carli

External links
 

1936 films
Italian black-and-white films
1930s Italian-language films
1936 drama films
Films based on works by Salvator Gotta
Films directed by Mario Mattoli
Films set in Turin
Italian drama films
1930s Italian films